The 1952–53 Copa del Generalísimo was the 51st staging of the Spanish Cup. The competition began on 1 October 1952 and concluded on 21 June 1953 with the final.

First round

|}

Second round

|}

 Tiebreaker 1

|}
 Tiebreaker 2

|}
 Tiebreaker 3

|}

Third round

|}

Round of 16

|}

Quarter-finals

|}

Semi-finals

|}

Final

|}

References

External links
 rsssf.com
 linguasport.com

Copa del Rey seasons
1952–53 in Spanish football cups